Hardricourt is a commune in the Yvelines department in the Île-de-France region in north-central France.

The castle of Hardricourt was between 1970 and 2011 the property of Jean-Bedel Bokassa, from 1966 dictator and between 1977 and 1979 self-appointed emperor of the Central African Republic. He was overthrown in 1977 and, after a period in the Ivory Coast, lived in the castle in exile from c. 1983 to 1986.

See also
Communes of the Yvelines department

References

Communes of Yvelines